SS Music or Southern Spice Music channel was a satellite television channel based in Chennai, India. The multilingual music channel broadcast film music songs from Tamil, Telugu, Malayalam and Kannada film industry. The music channel also aired mainstream international music from US, UK, Europe regions. The company was started by Fortune Media PVT LTD the parent company, as a lottery channel to announce lottery results. In 2004 the company was approached by MTV India for a takeover, to be branded as MTV South, but the deal fell through.

About the channels shows and hosts

Southern spice Music was started in 2001 as a pure music entertainment channel, with English as their language of communication and the content in the multilingual format, mainly Tamil, Telugu, Malayalam and Kannada. The southern state languages of India mainly focusing on South Indian people.

The reality shows like Voice hunt, VJ Factor, Launchpad, Dance with me, Challenge made the music channel famous in South India.

The daily show like Reach out, Virtual request, Connect, FIR, Hi5, Room with a view, Career show, Game station were hosted by 
VJ Craig, VJ Sriya reddy VJ Carry, VJ Paloma,  VJ Pooja, VJ Rajiv, VJ Shyam, Vj Shaunak and many others.

References

External links
 Official website

Television channels and stations established in 2001
Television stations in Chennai
2001 establishments in Tamil Nadu